West Side Story is a 2021 American musical romantic drama film directed and co-produced by Steven Spielberg from a screenplay by Tony Kushner. It is the second feature-length adaptation of the 1957 stage musical of the same name. It stars Ansel Elgort and Rachel Zegler in her film debut with Ariana DeBose, David Alvarez, Mike Faist, and Rita Moreno in supporting roles. Moreno, who starred in the 1961 film adaptation, also served as an executive producer, alongside Kushner. The film features music composed by Leonard Bernstein, with lyrics by Stephen Sondheim.

West Side Story had its world premiere at Jazz at Lincoln Center's Rose Theater in New York City on November 29, 2021, three days after the death of Sondheim. The movie was theatrically distributed by Walt Disney Studios Motion Pictures through the 20th Century Studios label in the United States on December 10, after being delayed a year due to the COVID-19 pandemic. The film received critical and audience acclaim alike, with praise for its acting and musical performances, Spielberg's direction, and the cinematography, with some critics deeming it superior to the 1961 film. It was named one of the top ten films of 2021 by the National Board of Review and the American Film Institute. 

At the 94th Academy Awards, the film has received seven nominations, including Best Picture. It became the second adaptation of the same source material for a previous Best Picture winner to be nominated for the same award after 1962's Mutiny on the Bounty. With his Best Picture nod, Spielberg became the most nominated individual in the category with eleven films. Spielberg's Best Director nomination also made him the first filmmaker to be nominated in that category in six consecutive decades. Paul Tazewell became the first African American male costume designer to be nominated for Best Costume Design for his work on the film.

At the 79th Golden Globe Awards, it received four nominations and three wins, including Best Motion Picture – Musical or Comedy. Zegler made history as the first actress of Colombian descent/Latina to win Best Actress – Motion Picture Comedy or Musical for her performance as Maria as well as becoming the youngest winner in that category at 20 years old. It also tied with Belfast for a leading eleven nominations at the 27th Critics' Choice Awards, including Best Picture, and won two awards, including Best Editing. In addition, it received five nominations at the 75th British Academy Film Awards, including Best Actor in a Supporting Role for Faist, and won two awards, including Best Casting.

For her performance as Anita, DeBose became the first Afro-Latina and openly queer woman of color to win the Academy Award for Best Supporting Actress and the Screen Actors Guild Award for Outstanding Performance by a Female Actor in a Supporting Role. With Moreno also having won the same aforementioned award, DeBose's win matched a record for the most acting Oscar wins for the same character after Marlon Brando and Robert De Niro's portrayals of Vito Corleone and Heath Ledger and Joaquin Phoenix's portrayals of the Joker with it also being the first time it went to a pair of actresses who played the same part and in the same category. DeBose also won the Golden Globe Award for Best Supporting Actress – Motion Picture, the BAFTA Award for Best Actress in a Supporting Role, and the Critics' Choice Movie Award for Best Supporting Actress.

Accolades

See also
 2021 in film

Notes

References

External links
 

Lists of accolades by film
Disney-related lists